The year 2005 is the third year in the history of Jungle Fight, a mixed martial arts promotion based in Brazil. In 2005 Jungle Fight held 2 events beginning with, Jungle Fight 4.

Events list

Jungle Fight 4

Jungle Fight 4 was an event held on May 21, 2005, at The Tropical Hotel in Manaus, Amazonas, Brazil.

Results

Jungle Fight 5

Jungle Fight 5 was an event held on November 26, 2005, at The Tropical Hotel in Manaus, Amazonas, Brazil.

Results

References

2005 in mixed martial arts
Jungle Fight events
Sport in Manaus